The 1886 Kentucky Derby was the 12th running of the Kentucky Derby. The race took place on May 14, 1886. The winning time of 2:36.50 set a new Derby record.

Full results

 Winning Breeder: Daniel Swigert; (KY)

Payout

The winner received a purse of $4,890.
Second place received $300.
Third place received $150.

References

1886
Kentucky Derby
Kentucky Derby
Derby